Türmitz may refer to:

 Ciermięcice, village in Poland
 Trmice, town in the Czech Republic